Massachusetts Senate's 2nd Worcester district in the United States is one of 40 legislative districts of the Massachusetts Senate. It covers portions of Worcester county. Democrat Mike Moore of Millbury has represented the district since 2009.

Locales represented
The district includes the following localities:
 Auburn
 Grafton
 Leicester
 Millbury
 part of Northbridge
 Shrewsbury
 Upton
 part of Worcester

Former locales

The district previously covered the following:
 Blackstone, circa 1860s
 Douglas, circa 1860s
 Mendon, circa 1860s
 Milford, circa 1860s
 Northborough, circa 1860s
 Southborough, circa 1860s
 Uxbridge, circa 1860s
 Westborough, circa 1860s

Senators 
 Edward Cowee
 Clarence Hobbs
 Albert Taylor Rhodes
 Edgar C. Erickson, circa 1935 
 Stephen F. Loughlin, circa 1945 
 Harold R. Lundgren, circa 1957 
 John Joseph Conte, circa 1969 
 Robert A. Hall, circa 1975
 Guy Glodis, circa 2002 
 Edward M. Augustus, Jr., 2005-2008
 Michael O. Moore, 2009-current

Images
Portraits of legislators

See also
 List of Massachusetts Senate elections
 List of Massachusetts General Courts
 List of former districts of the Massachusetts Senate
 Other Worcester County districts of the Massachusett Senate: 1st,  Hampshire, Franklin and Worcester; Middlesex and Worcester; Worcester, Hampden, Hampshire and Middlesex; Worcester and Middlesex; Worcester and Norfolk
 Worcester County districts of the Massachusetts House of Representatives: 1st, 2nd, 3rd, 4th, 5th, 6th, 7th, 8th, 9th, 10th, 11th, 12th, 13th, 14th, 15th, 16th, 17th, 18th

References

External links
 Ballotpedia
  (State Senate district information based on U.S. Census Bureau's American Community Survey).
 
 League of Women Voters of the Worcester Area

Senate
Government in Worcester County, Massachusetts
Massachusetts Senate